Stimulation  is the action of various agents or forms of energy (stimuli) on receptors that generate impulses that travel through nerves to the brain.

Stimulation may also refer to:

 Stimulation (album), 1961 jazz album by Johnny "Hammond" Smith
""Stimulation" (song), a 1986 single by Wa Wa Nee
 Stimulation, 2013 song by disclosure from their album Settle.

Specific stimulations
 Well stimulation, the well activity
 Thermal laser stimulation, the defect imaging technique

See also
 Stimulus (disambiguation)
 Simulation (disambiguation)